Jawad Ghaziyar is a popular Afghan  singer. He is one of the 1980s era singers who took refuge in United States after the fall of Afghanistan government in 1992. Jawad was also a special judge in Season 8 of Afghan Star.

Discography 
(This list is not comprehensive and does not include albums released in Afghanistan)

Melate Ghamdeeda
Sadai-e-Maihaan
Dost
Chaman-e-Cheraghan
Sanam
Shireen-e-Roba
Sahar

References

Living people
Afghan male singers
Year of birth missing (living people)